If I Had Known: Essential Recordings, 1980–96 is a two-disc retrospective of music recorded by American folk singer/guitarist Greg Brown.

The seventeen tracks have all been previously released and remastered.

The second disc is a 46-minute limited-edition DVD containing a 1993 documentary on Brown and his music, interviews with Brown, his parents, Garrison Keillor, and others.

Reception

Writing for Allmusic, music critic Jeff Burger wrote of the album "Brown released well over 100 songs on 13 albums during the period covered, and nearly all of those tunes are worth hearing. If you're a fan, you probably already have many of the original CDs... The film should be of great interest to longtime fans and newcomers alike; indeed, it's enough to justify buying this package, even if you already own most or all of the songs on disc one." Russell Hall of No Depression wrote of the album "“Wryly observant, and foregoing the facile introspection that’s the bane of the modern singer-songwriter, Brown is the folk music equivalent of the canary in the coal mine, continually testing the air of contemporary culture. The fact that he’s never succumbed to cynicism testifies to the resiliency of spirit about which he sings as well. Beautifully remastered, and supplemented with a limited edition 1993 DVD documentary, "Hacklebarney Tunes" by Jeffrey Ruoff. If I Had Known is the perfect launching point into the work one of American’s most gifted songwriters."

Track listing
All songs by Greg Brown.
 "If I Had Known"
 "Worrisome Years"
 "Laughing River"
 "Canned Goods"
 "Who Would Thunk It?"
 "The Train Carrying Jimmie Rodgers Home"
 "Ella Mae"
 "Our Little Town"
 "Good Morning Coffee"
 "Downtown"
 "You Drive Me Crazy"
 "Spring Wind"
 "The Poet Game "
 "Where is Maria?"
 "Boomtown"
 "Two Little Feet"
 "Driftless"

Personnel
Greg Brown – vocals, guitar, harmonica
Bo Ramsey – guitar
Rick Cicalo – bass
Pat Donohue – guitar
Al Murphy – fiddle
Steve Hayes – drums
David Hansen – bass
John Angus Foster – bass
Robin Adnan Anders – cymbals, tupan, dourbakee
Rob Arthur – Hammond organ
Felix James – conga
Gordon Johnson – bass
Dave Moore – harmonica, Pan pipes
Willie Murphy – piano
Kelly Joe Phelps – slide guitar
Ron Rohovit – bass
Prudence Johnson – background vocals
Dean Magraw – guitar
Radoslav Lorković – accordion
Kate McKenzie – background vocals
Randy Sabien – violin
Al Souchek – clarinet
David Williams – mandolin

References 

Greg Brown (folk musician) albums
2003 compilation albums
Red House Records albums